Léandre Grandmoulin (12 November 1873 – 10 March 1957) was a Belgian sculptor. His work was part of the sculpture event in the art competition at the 1936 Summer Olympics.

References

1873 births
1957 deaths
20th-century Belgian sculptors
20th-century male artists
Belgian sculptors
Olympic competitors in art competitions
People from La Hulpe